American rapper B.G. has released ten studio albums, twenty-one singles, one promotional single and eleven music videos.

Albums

Studio albums

Collaboration albums

Singles

As lead artist

As featured artist

Promotional singles

Guest appearances

Music videos

As lead artist

As featured artist

Notes

References

External links
 
 
 

Hip hop discographies
Discographies of American artists